Eric Harvey Spinney (August 10, 1886 – August 2, 1972) was a Canadian politician. He represented the electoral district of Yarmouth in the Nova Scotia House of Assembly from 1956 to 1960. He was a member of the Nova Scotia Liberal Party.

Early life and education
Spinney was born in 1886 at Yarmouth, Nova Scotia. He was educated at the University of King's College and the University of Toronto, and was a business executive.

Political career
Spinney served as mayor of Yarmouth from 1938 to 1944, and 1946 to 1950.

Spinney entered provincial politics in the 1956 election, winning a seat for the dual-member Yarmouth riding with Liberal Willard O'Brien. He was defeated when he ran for re-election in 1960, losing to O'Brien and Progressive Conservative candidate George A. Burridge.

Death
Spinney died at Montreal on August 2, 1972.

Personal life
He married Flora MacGregor Harding in 1920, and then Eunice Mae Milberry in 1943.

References

1886 births
1972 deaths
Mayors of places in Nova Scotia
Nova Scotia Liberal Party MLAs
People from Yarmouth, Nova Scotia
University of King's College alumni
University of Toronto alumni